Farook Abdul Rahiman (born 5 November 1966) is an Indian filmmaker and writer. Farook was born into a Rowther family. Starting his career as an Assistant Director in television films of Dooradarshan, Farook was drawn into independent film making after his debut feature film

Early life 
Farook Abdul Rahiman was born in Thattamangalam, Chittur of Palakkad, to Abdul Rahiman and Ayisha He attended Seri Sahib Memorial High School at Thathamangalam, and completed his Bachelor in Commerce at Chittur Government College. He has two daughters.

Career 

He started his professional career in Television films at the age of 18 as Assistant Director on Dooradarshan Malayalam television film "Nangema kutty"(1984) and then assisted Malayalam Director  P.N. Menon in his television film "Ethalukal"-Petals. Later produced Malayalam Television Films "Sthree Parvam" and "Kulam"-Clan. His directorial debut was the television film "Vyathiyanam"-Digression - Story of a young man with unusual thoughts and his life in Malayalam, broadcast by Dooradarshan Thiruvananathapuram. He directed Kaliyachan (The Master of the Play) based on P. Kunhiraman Nair's poem of the same name which won Kerala State Film Award for the Best Debutant director (2015). Based on his movie a book Puza pol chirichu maza pol karanju was also written by Farook Abdul Rahiman in 2021.

Filmography

References 

1966 births
Living people
20th-century Indian film directors
People from Palakkad district
Malayalam film directors
Film directors from Kerala
21st-century Indian film directors
Screenwriters from Kerala